"Beachball" is a song by German production team Nalin & Kane, released in June 1997 as a single. It was number-one for four weeks on the Canadian RPM Dance/Urban chart and reached number two in Spain, number 10 in Germany and number 19 in Switzerland. The song also reached the top 40 in Austria, Belgium, Germany, Ireland, Italy and the Netherlands.

A Tall Paul remix of the song reached number seven in Ireland and number 17 in the United Kingdom in October 1998.

Critical reception
Pan-European magazine Music & Media wrote, "Bouncing onto the airwaves comes a summery helping of minimalistic trance. This German production duo have come up with a sparsely arranged and yet remarkably tuneful number. With the proper support—and the proverbial little bit of luck—Messrs Nalin and Kane should be able to emulate the massive chart success they enjoyed in their homeland a couple of months ago. In spite of their length—which undoubtedly renders them less than suitable for mainstream radio play—the selection of remixes on offer is also well worthy of further investigation." 

Chris Finan from Music Weeks RM Dance Update gave it four out of five, commenting, "German duo Nalin & Kane get a run of only 2,000 copies on this release from Hooj. Chill-out trance is a simple guide to this tune—it has moody electro influences but with a steady beat which gives this an amazing flexibility as to where and when it can be played. Sometimes minimal, sometimes drifty but always mesmerising in its four mixes. The Seaside mix works best, though, featuring the greater of the hooks and probably appealing more to the mainstream than the others. Shame it's limited really."

Track listings
 CD maxi-single (Europe, 1997) "Beachball" (Vocal Radio Edit) – 3:52
 "Beachball" (Original Radio Edit) – 3:57
 "Beachball" (Extended Vocal Mix) – 7:36
 "Beachball" (Original Club Mix) – 10:23
 "Beachball" (Sea Side Mix) – 8:10

 CD maxi-single Remix (Europe, 1997)'
 "Beachball" (Sharam Baywatch Remix) – 9:32
 "Beachball" (Shahin & Simon Remix) – 5:43
 "Beachball" (Daniel Klein & Basti Remix) – 9:51
 "Beachball" (Tom Civic Remix) – 6:12

Charts

Original version

Remix version

Year-end charts

Certifications

References

1997 songs
1997 singles
Trance songs